Auer ("someone living by a water meadow []" in German, "haze" in Finnish) is a surname. Notable people with the surname include:

 Alois Auer (1813–1869), Austrian printer, inventor and botanical illustrator
 Augie Auer (1940–2007), New Zealand atmospheric scientist and meteorologist
 Barbara Auer (born 1959), German actress
 Benjamin Auer (born 1981), German soccer player
 Christian Auer (born 1966), Austrian skeleton racer
 Doris Auer (born 1971), Austrian pole vaulter
 Edward Auer (born 1941), American classical pianist
 Florence Auer (1880–1962), American theater and motion picture actress whose career spanned more than five decades
 Franz Auer (1918–1983), Austrian chess master
 Fritz Auer (born 1933), German architect
 Gerhard Auer (born 1943), German rower
 Gregory M. Auer (1937–1993), American art-director, screenwriter and cameraman
 Hans Auer (1847–1906), Swiss-Austrian architect
 Hansjörg Auer (1984–2019), Austrian mountaineer
 Howie Auer (1908–1985), American football player
 Hubert Auer (born 1981), Austrian footballer
 Ignaz Auer (1846–1907), German politician
 Ilmari Auer (1879–1965), Finnish politician and farmer
 Ingeborg Auer, Austrian climatologist
 Joe Auer (born 1941), American football running back
 Johann Paul Auer (1636–1687)
 John Auer (1875–1948), American physiologist
 John F. Auer (1866–1951), sailor in the United States Navy
 Jon Auer (born 1969), American musician
 Judith Auer (1905–1944), resistance fighter against the Nazi régime in Germany
 Leopold Auer (1845–1930), Hungarian violinist and conductor
 Lucas Auer (born 1994), Austrian racing driver
 Martin Auer (born 1951), Austrian writer
 Martin S. Auer (1918–1991), New York state senator
 Matthew Auer, Dean of the Hutton Honors College at Indiana University in Bloomington, Indiana
 Michael E. Auer (born 1948), German computer scientist
 Mischa Auer (1905–1957), Russian actor and the grandson of Leopold Auer
 Monika Auer (born 1957), Italian luger
 Ron Auer (born 1950), American politician
 Väinö Auer (1895-1981), Finnish geologist and geographer
 Victor Auer (1937–2011), sports shooter

See also 
 Auer von Welsbach
 Auer (disambiguation)

References

German-language surnames